Divanlı is a village in the Yozgat Province of Turkey. As of 2012, the village has a population 602 which is less than half the population the village had in 2000. In 2000, Divanlı had a population of 1,545, which was a 37.5% increase from its population in 1985.

The village became the center of attention in Yozgat in 2008 when Divanlı was selected to become the site of the Yozgat YHT railway station, which will service high-speed trains along the Ankara-Sivas high-speed railway. The station is expected to be completed by the end of 2018. 

An unnamed road connects Divanlı to the İL 66-25, which connects to the D.200 highway.

References

Villages in Yozgat Province
Yozgat